Acacia epedunculata is a shrub belonging to the genus Acacia and the subgenus Juliflorae that is endemic to a very small area in arid parts of western Australia.

Description
The shrub is low, spreading and multi-stemmed. The branchlets have glabrous and resinous ribs with silky haired new shoots in between. Like most species of Acacia it has phyllodes rather than true leaves. The grey-green to silvery light green coloured phyllodes are substraight and shallowly incurved with a flat to compressed-rhombic shape. It blooms in August producing yellow flowers. Following flowering thinly-crustaceous seed pods form that have a linear shape but are slightly constricted between each of the quite widely spaced seeds.

Distribution
It is native to an area in the Goldfields-Esperance region of Western Australia where it is commonly situated on sand-plains growing in yellow sandy soils.

See also
List of Acacia species

References

epedunculata
Acacias of Western Australia
Taxa named by Bruce Maslin
Plants described in 1995